Thomas Vavasour (1560–1620) was an English soldier, courtier and Member of Parliament.

He came from a family long established in Yorkshire. His grandfather was William Vavasour and his father was Henry Vavasour (died 1584) of Copmanthorpe, Yorkshire. His mother, Margaret, was the daughter of Sir Henry Knyvet (died 1547) of Charlton, Wiltshire. Thomas was educated at Eton and  Caius College, Cambridge, where he was a fellow commoner.

In 1576 he married Mary, daughter and heiress of John Dodge of Copes, Suffolk, widow of Peter Houghton, alderman of London. They had four sons and two daughters.

He became involved in court scandal and rivalry through the actions of his elder sister, Anne.

He was Member of Elizabethan Parliaments for Wootton Bassett in the 1584 and 1586 parliaments, and member for Malmesbury in the 1589 parliament.

In August 1585 he fought in the Netherlands as captain of foot from Yorkshire, retaining this command until 1591. He distinguished himself on two occasions, once in an attack on a sconce near Arnhem in October 1585, and again in 1587 with Lord Willoughby to fight the Marques del Guasto.

He is thought to have been knighted before August 1595, though the record is unclear.

Following military service he was a gentleman pensioner until the death of the Queen at Richmond Palace in March 1603. Following the accession of James I, Vavasour was made Butler of the port of London, earning him £1,000 compensation. In 1604 he was appointed Knight Marshal of the Household, a role confirmed to him for life in 1612 but, according to John Chamberlain, he sold the right for £3,000, in 1618, two years before his death.

He returned to parliament in 1609 to represent Boroughbridge after the death in office of Sir John Ferne and was re-elected in 1614 to represent Horsham.

In October 1618 he sold the office of Knight Marshall to Sir Edward Zouch for £3000.

Vavasour's wealth and connection to the court allowed the construction of Ham House in 1610 on land belonging to the Crown. After his death in 1620 the lease passed to John Ramsay, 1st Earl of Holderness, a favourite of the King.

References

1560 births
1620 deaths
Alumni of Gonville and Caius College, Cambridge
English MPs 1584–1585
English MPs 1586–1587
English MPs 1589
English MPs 1604–1611
English MPs 1614
Thomas
People educated at Eton College